Half Breed is a 1914 Swedish silent drama film directed by Victor Sjöström.

Cast
 John Ekman as Ribera
 Georg Grönroos
 William Larsson as von Wüler
 Erik Lindholm
 Karin Molander as Narianne Rizetski
 Greta Pfeil as Soledad
 Gunnar Tolnæs s von Stahl

References

External links

1914 films
1910s Swedish-language films
Swedish black-and-white films
1914 drama films
Swedish silent films
Films directed by Victor Sjöström
Swedish drama films
Silent drama films